The Woman from Monte Carlo  is an American pre-Code film produced by Warner Bros. subsidiary First National Pictures (with the Vitaphone logo) in 1931 and released on January 9, 1932. It was directed by Michael Curtiz and gave top billing to German star Lil Dagover in her sole Hollywood film. Leading men Walter Huston and Warren William were listed after the title in the manner of supporting players.

Plot

Cast
 Lil Dagover as Lottie Corlaix
 Walter Huston as Captain Corlaix
 Warren William as Lieutenant D'Ortelles
 John Wray as Commander Brambourg
 George E. Stone as Le Duc
 Robert Warwick as Mobraz
 Matt McHugh Chief Petty Officer Vincent 
 Frederick Burton as  President of court-martial
 Frank Leigh as Pilot
 Francis McDonald as Karkuff
 Warner Richmond as Fourdylis
 Reginald Barlow as Defense attorney

Other works based on the play
The play on which the film is based, Claude Farrère's and Lucien Népoty's Veille d'Armes (also listed as Veilles d'Armes) was adapted by Michael Morton and titled In the Night Watch upon its London opening on December 21, 1918 and its New York debut on January 29, 1921. The 1921 Broadway production by the Shubert brothers starred Jeanne Eagels, with Robert Warwick (playing a sixth-billed supporting character in the film) in Walter Huston's role of the husband and Edmund Lowe in the Warren William part of the lovestruck lieutenant. It provided the plot line for a 1925 French silent directed by Jacques de Baroncelli and distributed as Before the Battle in the English-speaking world. An American silent version was released in 1928 under the title Night Watch, directed by Alexander Korda, with stars Billie Dove and Paul Lukas. Three years after the release of The Woman from Monte Carlo, another French version, directed by Marcel L'Herbier, with stars Annabella and Victor Francen, was released and subsequently marketed in English-speaking countries as Sacrifice of Honor.

References

External links

1932 films
American drama films
American black-and-white films
American films based on plays
Films directed by Michael Curtiz
First National Pictures films
1932 drama films
1930s English-language films
1930s American films
Films scored by Bernhard Kaun